La petite mort (French for "the little death") is a metaphor for orgasm.

La petite mort may also refer to:

 La petite mort, a 1995 short film by François Ozon
 Petite Mort (dance work), a 1991 work by choreographer Jiří Kylián
 "Petite Mort", 2004 song by the Canadian band Stars
 "La Petite Mort", a song by Violet Chachki from her 2015 EP Gagged
 La petite mort, short film by Jason Merrells
 La Petite Mort (James album), a 2014 album
 La Petite Mort or a Conversation with God, a 2016 album by King 810

See also
 Little Death (disambiguation)